John Patrick Treacy (July 23, 1891 – October 11, 1964) was an American prelate of the Roman Catholic Church who served as bishop of the Diocese of La Crosse in Wisconsin from 1948 until his death in 1964.

Biography

Early life and education
Treacy was born on July 23, 1891, in Marlborough, Massachusetts, the only child of John and Ann (née O'Kane) Treacy. He attended the College of the Holy Cross in Worcester, Massachusetts, and studied at Harvard Law School before enrolling at the Catholic University of America in Washington, D.C. Following his graduation from the Catholic University in 1912, Treacyreturned to Massachusetts and studied at St. John's Seminary in Boston.

Priesthood and ministry
Treacy was ordained to the priesthood for the Diocese of Cleveland, Ohio, on December 8, 1918.

After 12 years in parish work, Treacy became diocesan director of the Society for the Propagation of the Faith in 1931. He was elevated to a domestic prelate by Pope Pius XI in 1934. In 1939, he was named by President Franklin D. Roosevelt to a 25-member committee for a good-neighbor mission to Latin America.

Coadjutor Bishop and Bishop of La Crosse
On August 22, 1945, Treacy was appointed coadjutor bishop of the Diocese of La Crosse and titular bishop of Metelis by Pope Pius XII. He received his episcopal consecration on October 2. 1945. from Archbishop Amleto Giovanni Cicognani, with Bishops Edward Hoban and William O'Brien serving as co-consecrators.

Upon the death of Bishop Alexander McGavick, Treacy succeeded him as the fifth bishop of La Crosse on August 25, 1948. During his 16-year tenure, he founded Holy Cross Seminary, oversaw the construction of the Cathedral of Saint Joseph the Workman in La Crosse, and established 47 churches, 43 convents, and 42 schools. He also ordered the closing of the Necedah Shrine of Mary Van Hoof  in Necedah, Wisconsin, in 1950.  Van Hoof had claimed to experience religious visions, but the Vatican had determined her claims to be false.. He attended the first two sessions of the Second Vatican Council in Rome between 1962 and 1963.

Patrick Treacy died on October 11, 1964 at St. Francis Hospital in La Crosse.

See also

 Catholic Church hierarchy
 Catholic Church in the United States
 Historical list of the Catholic bishops of the United States
 List of Catholic bishops of the United States
 Lists of patriarchs, archbishops, and bishops

References

External links
Roman Catholic Diocese of La Crosse

1891 births
1964 deaths
College of the Holy Cross alumni
Saint John's Seminary (Massachusetts) alumni
Harvard Law School alumni
Catholic University of America alumni
Religious leaders from Cleveland
People from Marlborough, Massachusetts
20th-century Roman Catholic bishops in the United States
Participants in the Second Vatican Council
Roman Catholic Diocese of Cleveland
Roman Catholic bishops of La Crosse
Catholics from Massachusetts
American Roman Catholic clergy of Irish descent